The Sixth of July is a 1968 Soviet drama film directed by Yuli Karasik. The film is based on real historical events and is dedicated to the 50th anniversary of the Bolsheviks suppression of the Left SR Uprising, during the Russian Civil War.

Plot 
In Russia, there is hunger, devastation and intervention. On July 4, the Fifth All-Russian Congress of Soviets of Workers, Peasants, Red Army and Cossack Deputies opens in Moscow. In the ranks of the revolutionaries is a split - Left Social Revolutionaries are trying to wrest power from the hands of the Bolsheviks. At the request of the Left Socialist-Revolutionary faction, a representative of the underground Ukrainian peasant congress Aleksandrov addressed the deputies with a fiery speech. He calls on the audience to vote for the rejection of the infamous Brest-Litovsk treaty.

After Lenin's speech, which rejected any war with the German Empire, the congress adopts a Bolshevik resolution approving the activities of the Council of People's Commissars.

On July 6, the Central Committee of the Left Socialist Revolutionary Party gathered for an emergency meeting. To break the treaty, which they saw as counterrevolutionary, a decision was made to physically eliminate the German ambassador Wilhelm von Mirbach.

The assassination of the ambassador signaled the beginning of an uprising. One by one the buildings of the most important city services fall into the hands of the revolutionaries. Dzerzhinski and Latsis were arrested. A message is received from Yaroslavl about a rebellion led by the Socialist Revolutionary Boris Savinkov.

By evening, using their last reserves, the Bolsheviks sent delegates to the labor collectives for mass agitation and organization of the defense of the city. They resolve to counteract the uprising, not with volunteers, but an organized military force.

At dawn, units of the Latvian Riflemen entered the city. Danishevsky, sent for negotiations, completed his mission successfully. After several hours of heavy fighting, the Left Socialist Revolutionary uprising was crushed.

On July 9, 1918, the Fifth All-Russian Congress of Soviets of Workers, Peasants, Red Army and Cossack Deputies continued its work, now under Bolshevik one-party rule.

Cast

See also 
 Left Socialist Revolutionary Party
 Left SR Uprising
 Left-wing uprisings against the Bolsheviks

References

External links 
 

1968 films
1960s Russian-language films
Soviet drama films
1968 drama films